The 2021 Lehigh Mountain Hawks football team represented Lehigh University in the 2021 NCAA Division I FCS football season. The Mountain Hawks, led by third-year head coach Tom Gilmore, played their home games at Goodman Stadium as a member of the Patriot League.

Schedule

References

Lehigh
Lehigh Mountain Hawks football seasons
Lehigh Mountain Hawks football